Wallingford station may refer to:
 Wallingford station (Connecticut), an Amtrak station in Wallingford, Connecticut, USA
 Wallingford station (SEPTA), a SEPTA Regional Rail station in Wallingford, Pennsylvania, USA
 Wallingford railway station (England), Wallingford, Oxfordshire, England

See also
Wallingford (disambiguation)